During President George W. Bush's two term tenure in office, a few of his nominations for  federal judgeships were blocked by the Senate Democrats either directly in the Senate Judiciary Committee or on the full Senate floor in various procedural moves, including the first use of a fillibuster to block a Federal Appeals Court nominee. Republicans labeled it an unwarranted obstruction of professionally qualified judicial nominees.

List of unsuccessful federal judicial nominations
Bush made 53 nominations for federal judgeships that were not confirmed by the Senate. Of these, 14 were withdrawn by Bush, while the other 39 expired at an adjournment of the Senate, including 30 that expired at the close of the 110th Congress. As of October 16, 2019, 12 of his unsuccessful nominees had been nominated to federal judgeships by subsequent presidents, with 10 of them having been confirmed.

107th Congress
Yale law professor Bruce Ackerman argued in a February 2001 edition of the magazine The American Prospect that Bush should not be permitted to place nominees on the Supreme Court during his first term due to the Supreme Court's decision in Bush v. Gore. In addition, law professors Cass Sunstein (University of Chicago) and Laurence Tribe (Harvard), along with Marcia Greenberger of the National Women's Law Center, counseled Senate Democrats in April 2001 "to scrutinize judicial nominees more closely than ever." Specifically, they said, "there was no obligation to confirm someone just because they are scholarly or erudite."

In March 2001, the Bush administration stopped relying on the American Bar Association (ABA) for the screening process for qualified judicial candidates. The administration justified the move by saying the ABA was liberal.

On May 9, 2001, President Bush announced his first eleven court of appeals nominees in a special White House ceremony. This initial group of nominees included Roger Gregory, a Clinton recess-appointed judge to the Fourth Circuit, as a peace offering to Senate Democrats. There was, however, immediate concern expressed by Senate Democrats and liberal groups like the Alliance for Justice. Democratic Senator Charles E. Schumer of New York said that the White House was "trying to create the most ideological bench in the history of the nation."

108th Congress
During the 108th Congress in which the Republicans regained control of the Senate by a 51-49 margin, the nominees that the Senate Democrats had blocked in the 107th Congress began to be moved through the now Republican Senate Judiciary Committee. Subsequently, Senate Democrats started to filibuster judicial nominees. On February 12, 2003, Miguel Estrada, a nominee for the D.C. Circuit, became the first court of appeals nominee ever to be successfully filibustered. Later, nine other conservative court of appeals nominees were also filibustered. These nine were Priscilla Owen, Charles W. Pickering, Carolyn Kuhl, David McKeague, Henry Saad, Richard Allen Griffin, William H. Pryor, William Gerry Myers III and Janice Rogers Brown. Three of the nominees (Estrada, Pickering and Kuhl) withdrew their nominations before the end of the 108th Congress. Bush nominee Sandra Segal Ikuta would later be appointed to the seat Kuhl was nominated for.

As a result of these ten filibusters, Senate Republicans began to threaten to change the existing Senate rules by using what Senator Trent Lott termed the "nuclear option". This change in rules would eliminate the use of the filibuster to prevent judicial confirmation votes. However, in the 108th Congress, with only a two-vote majority, the Republicans were in a weak position to implement this procedural maneuver.

On October 7, 2004, just prior to the presidential election, Senate Democrats issued a statement complete with statistics arguing that they were not obstructing Bush nominees in any systemic way. District court candidates nominated by Bush were being confirmed at a higher rate than those similarly situated candidates nominated by Presidents Ronald Reagan and Bill Clinton in their first term. Bush's success rate at getting circuit court of appeals nominees confirmed during his first term (67%) was less than those of Reagan (85%) and Clinton (71%), although higher than Clinton's second term (55%).

109th Congress
Things changed in 2005 due to the 2004 elections. With President Bush's re-election and the Republicans picking up further Senate seats (55-45) in the 109th Congress, the "nuclear option" became a more viable strategy to ensure confirmation. On May 24, 2005, seven moderate senators of each party, called the Gang of 14, in a deal to avoid the use of the "nuclear option", agreed to drop the filibuster against three of the seven remaining affected court of appeals nominees (Priscilla Owen, Janice Rogers Brown, and William Pryor) but not two others (Henry Saad and William Myers). In addition, the senators in the group agreed not to block future judicial nominees with filibusters except in cases involving "extraordinary circumstances".

As a direct result of the deal, the two filibustered nominees not mentioned in it (David McKeague and Richard Allen Griffin) were confirmed, as was Thomas B. Griffith, the person nominated to replace Miguel Estrada after his withdrawal. Griffith too had become the subject of controversy. Since Saad had no hope of a successful cloture vote to overcome his filibuster due to the deal, he withdrew his nomination in the spring of 2006. Bush nominee Raymond Kethledge would later be appointed to the seat.

At the end of the 109th Congress, a new controversy arose over William Myers and three other Bush court of appeals nominees who had not been specifically mentioned in the Gang deal but were still subject to its provisions: Terrence Boyle, William J. Haynes, II and Michael B. Wallace. These nominations were returned to the White House according to Senate rules on August 3, 2006 in advance of the annual August recess of Congress. When the Senate returned in September, it was only for a short period before a break for the 2006 midterm election. Although Boyle, Myers, Haynes and Wallace were renominated, again no action was taken on them in the Senate Judiciary Committee before the break, and their nominations were sent back a second time to the White House on September 29.

After the November 7, 2006 election in which Democrats picked up six additional Senate seats, President Bush again renominated the candidates whose nominations had been sent back to him in September. The Republican Judiciary Committee chairman, Senator Arlen Specter, however, said that he would not process these nominees during the lame duck session of the 109th Congress. Bush would later nominate Leslie H. Southwick to the seat Wallace was nominated for and he would be confirmed, while N. Randy Smith, who had previously been nominated for another seat on the Ninth Circuit, would be appointed to the seat Myers was nominated for. Obama nominee John B. Owens would later fill the seat Smith was originally nominated to. Southwick had previously been nominated to a seat on the United States District Court for the Southern District of Mississippi, which would later be filled by Obama nominee Carlton W. Reeves.

110th Congress

At the beginning of the 110th Congress in January 2007, President Bush did not renominate Boyle, Myers, Haynes and Wallace in an attempt at reconciliation with the Democrats.  However, that did not stop many Bush judicial nominees from being blocked in committee by the new Democratic chairman of the Senate Judiciary Committee, Senator Patrick Leahy.  Among those stalled in committee until their nominations lapsed were appellate nominees Peter Keisler, Robert J. Conrad, Steve A. Matthews and Glen E. Conrad. The latter three seats would later be filled by Obama nominees James A. Wynn Jr., Albert Diaz, and Barbara Milano Keenan.

Senator Harry Reid, the Democratic Majority Leader, and Chairman Leahy cited the previous controversy over President Clinton's court of appeals nominees in justifying why only ten Bush appellate nominees were confirmed during the 110th Congress. A total of eleven appellate seats with Bush nominees were left open at the end of the 110th Congress. Of those seats, two (i.e. the North Carolina and Maryland seats of the Fourth Circuit) had originally become available to fill during the administration of President Bill Clinton.

Others who were considered for nomination

In the spring of 2001, then-Representative Christopher Cox and lawyer Peter Keisler were both considered for federal appellate judgeships. Cox was considered for a California seat on the Ninth Circuit and Keisler for a Maryland seat on the Fourth Circuit. Both withdrew themselves from consideration before a nomination could be made because their home state Democratic senators objected to them due to their perceived conservatism. The California seat that Cox had been considered for was eventually filled by Bush nominee Carlos Bea. In 2005, Cox was nominated and confirmed as Chairman of the U.S. Securities and Exchange Commission, a position he held until the end of the Bush administration in January 2009. The Maryland seat that Keisler had been considered for was to remain open the entirety of Bush's presidency with the failed nominations of Claude Allen and Rod J. Rosenstein and would be filled by Obama nominee Andre M. Davis. in 2009. In 2006, Keisler was unsuccessfully nominated to a seat on the D.C. Circuit. The seat would be filled by Obama nominee Patricia Millett in 2013. In 2007, after the resignation of Alberto Gonzales, Keisler became the Acting Attorney General until the confirmation of Michael Mukasey. He left the Department of Justice in March 2008 to return to private practice.

See also
 Judicial appointment history for United States federal courts
 Deaths of United States federal judges in active service

Notes

References

judicial appointments
Bush, George W.